Antonín Dvořák composed his oratorio Saint Ludmila (Czech: Svatá Ludmila for soloists, choir and orchestra, between September 1885 and May 1886. The oratorio (Op. 71, B. 144) was written to a text by the leading Czech poet and writer Jaroslav Vrchlický. Saint Ludmila is Dvořák's third oratorio, and is considered one of his foremost works.

Background 
The work was commissioned by the publisher Littleton during Dvořák's first visit to England. It was intended for the Leeds Festival, and Dvořák, well acquainted with the English festival tradition, was attracted by the idea. He was also impressed by the high standard of English orchestras and choirs, and particularly by their performances of oratorios. On the other hand, he was also inspired by his own religiousness; he composed many works to Christian religious texts, as well as Hussite Overture, a "protestant" instrumental work.

Chronologically Saint Ludmila follows Symphony No. 7 in D Minor (finished in March, 1885), and both works are influenced by the actual historical events of that time. The year 1884 was restless for the Czechs; they organized demonstrations and patriotic manifestations of solidarity in the fight for freedom, the Austrian police had forbidden the singing of Czech songs, and the social situation was very tense. Dvořák turned to typical Czech and Slavonic themes during this time in order to support the national movement, although he was approached by his German publisher Simrock to depart from patriotic themes and instead create works based on world famous literary works. Dvořák, however, refused in one of his letters to Simrock saying, "... an artist also has a country for which he must have firm faith and a fervent heart." The work is thus of a national rather than religious character, which is apparent mainly in the choral scenes.

The first performance was not well received; the work was criticised for its length, its Czech theme and also for its alleged musical dependence on  George Frideric Handel, Felix Mendelssohn, Richard Wagner, Joseph Haydn and Ludwig van Beethoven. Dvořák later rewrote and reduced several parts of the composition. Saint Ludmila was premiered in Prague in 1901, and the first performance with the Czech Philharmonic Orchestra took place on 3 April 1904. However, Dvořák was seriously ill and didn't attend this performance.

Saint Ludmila has a long performance tradition on Czech concert stages. It was given at the third Prague Spring International Music Festival in 1948, conducted by Rafael Kubelík. It was Kubelík's last public performance in his native country for many years. In November 1954 the Czech Philharmonic with Karel Šejna performed the work at two concerts in the Smetana Hall of the Municipal House in Prague. In 1987 another concert took place, this time with the conductor Václav Neumann. The first performance in the 21st century was given in 2004, one hundred years after Dvořák's death, with the Czech Philharmonic and conductor Jiří Bělohlávek.

Structure 
The verses of the libretto are based on historical fact. Prince Rastislav of Moravia asked the brothers Cyril and Methodius of Thessalonica to spread Christianity in his country. In 863 they came bringing the Glagolitic alphabet which laid the foundation of Slavonic literature. During this time, Great Moravia came under the influence of the Byzantine Empire. Later, this cultural and political influence spread also to Bohemia and in 874, Bořivoj I, Duke of Bohemia and his wife Saint Ludmila were baptised.

The story is set at the beginning of this era. The hermit Ivan accepts the task of missionary, his eloquence winning over Ludmila, the Bohemian princess. She meets Prince Bořivoj and they are then married. Bořivoj is baptised under the influence of the new teaching and becomes Christian.

The libretto consists of three parts. The situation in the first part is tense as  Ivan comes into conflict with the pagans. Ludmila intervenes. In the second part Dvořák applied his talent for melody and ability to express feelings of love. The finale is festive and pompous with a statement of the ancient Czech chorale "Hospodine, pomiluj ny" ("Mighty Lord, have mercy upon us") which dates from about the eleventh century. The composition has been appreciated for its melodiousness and colourful instrumentation.

Part I

Part II

Part III

Roles

Recordings
 Dvořák: Svatá Ludmila – Lívia Ághová. WDR Sinfonieorchester Köln, Gerd Albrecht (2000)
 Dvořák: Svatá Ludmila – Eva Zikmundová, Beno Blachut. Prague Symphony Orchestra, Václav Smetáček (1963)

References

External links 
Original Urbanek Libretto, Prague, 1887
Info on a comprehensive Dvorak site
Saint Ludmila - performance review (Guardian.co.uk)
Saint Ludmila - CD review (Independent.co.uk)
Saint Lumila at České sbory.cz  
Review at muzikus.cz  

Compositions by Antonín Dvořák
Oratorios
1886 compositions
Czech-language choral compositions